USS Carnegie (CVE-38) (previously AVG-38 then later ACV-38) was an escort aircraft carrier built in 1942-43 for transfer to the United Kingdom. She was reclassified ACV-38 on 20 August 1942, and CVE-38 on 15 July 1943. She was commissioned on 9 August 1943 for a period of three days prior to being turned over to the United Kingdom, under whom she served as HMS Empress (D42).

Design and description

These ships were all larger and had a greater aircraft capacity than all the preceding American built escort carriers. They were also all laid down as escort carriers and not converted merchant ships.

Armament comprised: two 4"/50, 5"/38 or 5"/51 Dual Purpose guns in single mounts, sixteen 40 mm Bofors anti-aircraft guns in twin mounts and twenty 20 mm Oerlikon anti-aircraft cannons in single mounts. They had a maximum aircraft capacity of twenty-four aircraft which could be a mixture of Grumman Martlet, Vought F4U Corsair or Hawker Sea Hurricane fighter aircraft and Fairey Swordfish or Grumman Avenger anti-submarine aircraft.

Service history

During World War II, she served in both the Pacific and Indian Oceans. In September 1945, Empress was involved in Operation Tiderace, the reoccupation of Singapore from the Japanese. On 28 January 1946, she was restored to United States custody, was stricken from the Naval Vessel Register on 28 March 1946 and was sold for scrap 21 June 1946.

See also
 Andrew Carnegie

Notes

References

References
 

 

Ruler-class escort carriers
Ships built in Washington (state)
1942 ships
Andrew Carnegie